Justice Woodbridge may refer to:

Enoch Woodbridge, associate justice of the Vermont Supreme Court
William Woodbridge, associate justice of the Supreme Court for the Territory of Michigan